"Bad!" (stylized as "BAD!") is a song by American rapper and singer XXXTentacion, released as a single on November 9, 2018. It is XXXTentacion's fifth posthumous single, and his third posthumous single to go platinum.

Background 
"Bad!" was previously teased along with three album projects XXXTentacion was set to release in 2018 before his death in June. Publications reported that "Bad!" would appear on Skins after a clip of XXXTentacion was posted to his Instagram timeline of him talking about the album after singing a line from it. DJ Scheme also said that the next of XXXTentacion's projects to be released would be Skins; this was confirmed in November after the pre-order for the album became available.

Promotion 
The song was previewed in footage posted to XXXTentacion's Instagram timeline, with the rapper singing a line of the song and talking about Skins.

Music video 
In November 2018, the XXXTentacion estate, along with Bad Vibes Forever and Empire Records, launched an animated video contest for the new single. Several artists created 15-second animated snippets from which fans of the late rapper voted for their favorite via XXXTentacion's official website.

The official music video for "Bad!" was released via XXXTentacion's YouTube page on December 15, 2018. It was animated and directed by Tristan Zammit. It features anime-style depictions of X with his various signature hairstyles as he is planting, cultivating, and then becoming one with the tree of life. As of January 13, 2020, the music video has been viewed over 80 million times.

Covers 
In January 2019, Dutch DJ R3hab released a cover of "Bad!" as a tribute to XXXTentacion.

Personnel 
Credits adapted from YouTube.

 XXXTentacion – vocals, writing
 Dave Kutch – mastering
 Kevin Peterson – mastering assistant
 John Cunningham – production, writing, recording, drums, programming
 Robert Soukiasyan – production, writing, mixing, keyboards

Charts

Weekly charts

Year-end charts

Certifications

References

External links 

2018 singles
2018 songs
XXXTentacion songs
Songs released posthumously
Songs written by XXXTentacion
Empire Distribution singles